is an animated crossover television special which aired on April 7, 2013, on Fuji TV. It was made to commemorate the start of the third year of the Toriko anime, which premiered in April 2011, and it features characters from Dragon Ball Z, One Piece and Toriko. The special consists of two episodes which aired together: Episode 99 of Toriko, and episode 590 of One Piece, .

Plot

Part 1
The International Gourmet Organization (IGO) hosts a Food Tournament (Tenkaichi Kuōkai), consisting of a race to the center of the hosting island and the championship prize of luxuriously rare Carat Sizzled Cattle, hosted by the Tenkaichi Budokai Announcer, IGO Director Mansam and the "World's Strongest Man" Mister Satan. Luffy, Sanji, Chopper, Nami, Franky, Brook, Zoro, Toriko, Sunny, Rin, Komatsu, Setsuno, Goku, Gohan, Goten, Trunks, Android 18, and Master Roshi enter the tournament, while Robin, Coco, Krillin, Marron, Piccolo, Tien Shinhan, Yamcha, Chiaotzu, Puar, Ox-King, Yajirobe, Korin and Videl watch in the audience. As the race begins, all the other contestants are knocked out by a giant Konnanoarijigoku insect, leaving just those eighteen in the race.

The group arrive at a crossroads and split up between a mountain, desert and forest route. Sanji, Komatsu, Setsuno and Gohan travel through a forest, running into a Manpukuhihi; Rather than fight it, Setsuno explains that it will let them pass if they can satisfy its hunger and Sanji and Komatsu cook it several plates of food. On the desert route Brook and Roshi fake heat exhaustion and claim that indecent acts from Nami and Rin will help them recover, which is unsuccessful. Meanwhile, Franky irritates No. 18 by insisting how "Super" being a cyborg is. Elsewhere, Trunks and Goten use Fusion to become Gotenks; Chopper attempts to perform fusion himself, but his only partner is a disgusted Sunny, who refuses. Luffy, Toriko, Goku take the most difficult path: the mountain route. Goku races ahead of the other two, but is summoned by King Kai to stop an incoming dangerous creature from space. At the edge of the forest, Tina reports as Zoro arrives lost and is quickly challenged by Zebra. Having just heard of the race, Vegeta arrives looking for Goku, but quickly ends up in a three way challenge with the other two, prompting Tina to run in panic and end her coverage.

Luffy, Toriko, and Goku (having already defeated the space creature) reach the finish line and grab the Goal flag at the same time, instigating a battle between the three for victory; As the battle arena is assembled, Satan accidentally falls in and the other announcers assume he is competing alongside the three finalists. Luffy, Goku, and Toriko underestimate their attacks and destroy most of the arena, leaving only a small section where Satan is cowering. Because of this, Satan is technically the only contender still in bounds and wins the tournament. Satan decides to share the meat between all the finalists and their friends as a mysterious creature approaches the island.

Part 2
Satan shares the Carat Sizzled Cattle prize with the rest of the group, pointing out that he will enjoy it more by sharing it with his friends. During the meal, Robin, Piccolo and Coco become suspicious of the IGO's motives and question Mansam. Mansam reveals that the tournament was a plan to gather the world's strongest fighters and capture the Deep Sea Glutton creature Akami, which has the ability to suck out the energy of living things. Akami jumps out from the sea and steals the powers of Usopp, Satan, and Gohan, becoming larger and stronger. Akami escapes and Setsuno informs everyone that they have 30 minutes to catch it and save those it attacked.

Sanji, Brook, Franky, Sunny, Coco, Piccolo, Goten, and Trunks all attempt to attack Akami, but have their energy drained as well, allowing Akami to evolve into a more powerful form. Luffy, Toriko and Goku find and attack Akami, and are impressed by each other's fighting skills. Their attack is unsuccessful however, as Akami can now absorb the power of attacks thrown at it too. Therefore, Toriko realizes that they need to use an attack powerful enough to defeat Akami in a single hit. Goku asks Luffy and Toriko to distract Akami while he charges a Spirit Bomb, borrowing energy from the living beings around him. As Akami begins stealing energy from the charging Spirit Bomb, Goku requests that the other people at the tournament lend their energy to the attack too. Luffy, Toriko and Goku hit Akami with an Elephant Gatling, Twin Kugi Punch and Kamehameha alongside the Genki Dama, finishing off Akami. The group celebrates with a banquet, eating Akami, while Zoro, Zebra and Vegeta are still fighting elsewhere on the island.

Cast

Development
Characters from Dragon Ball and One Piece were already featured together in the 2006 special collaboration manga Cross Epoch, and characters from One Piece and Toriko were already featured together in a 2011 special One Piece x Toriko Crossover manga and two one-hour special Toriko × One Piece crossovers which aired in April 2011 and April 2012 respectively, and which were shown either before or after the weekly episodes of One Piece. Also, Toriko and One Piece share Fuji TV's "Dream 9" (ドリーム9) programming block that begins on Sundays at 9:00 a.m. since April 2011. The "Dream 9" tag was also previously used to promote the time slots of Dragon Ball Kai and One Piece during their original broadcast, as Dragon Ball Kai was followed by One Piece when it first aired in Japan; special eyecatches featuring the characters from both series were even made and shown between the two series. Also, various animated multi-screen Panic Adventure crossovers of various Shueisha manga series, including Dragon Ball and One Piece, have already been screened at special events.

Releases
The Super Collaboration Special aired split in two part in the time slot between 09:00 and 10:00 on Fuji TV, on April 7, 2013, which is one week after the movie Dragon Ball Z: Battle of Gods premiered in Japan. A special pre-sale Collaboration Ticket for the 2013 Battle of Gods and One Piece Z movies went on sale on November 23, 2012. The dual-ticket has a special illustration by both Eiichirō Oda and Akira Toriyama featuring Luffy and Goku.

On February 17, 2023, Toonami had announced that the second part of crossover special would finally receive an English dub release in North America on March 4, 2023, ahead of the 10th anniversary of the special's original air date in Japan. The first half was omitted due to Funimation no longer holding the copyright for the dub version of Toriko, as well as the dub having ceased at its fiftieth episode due to low sales of the English dub's release.

In other media
The three franchises in the Super Collaboration Special also collaborate in the 2013 crossover game J-Stars Victory VS (2014). Characters from Dragon Ball and One Piece are also featured together in the video games Jump Super Stars (2005), Battle Stadium D.O.N (2006), Jump Ultimate Stars (2006), Battle Taikan Gomu Gomu no Kamehameha (2008) and Jump Force (2019).

References

External links
 

2013 television specials
2010s animated television specials
Japanese television specials
Dragon Ball anime
One Piece mass media
Television crossover episodes
Animated crossover television specials
Fuji TV original programming